Jessica Calvello is an American voice actress and production assistant primarily known for her anime voiceover work, particularly with ADV Films, Seraphim Digital/Sentai Filmworks, DuArt Film and Video, Media Blasters, Funimation, Central Park Media, Headline Sound Studios,  New Generation Pictures, NYAV Post, 4Kids Entertainment and also known for her non-anime voice work on a number of animated shorts by, Cyanide and Happiness. Some of her more well known roles are Excel in Excel Saga, Nanael in Queen's Blade, Kanako Miyamae in Maria Holic, Zoe Hange in Attack on Titan and  Honey Kisaragi in New Cutey Honey, in which she was personally cast by the creator of the Cutey Honey franchise, Go Nagai, a role that Calvello describes as her most cherished and honored accomplishment.

Filmography

Anime
 Alien Nine - Kasumi Tomine
 Amagi Brilliant Park - Tiramy
 Angel Blade - Hasumi and Emily
 Arcade Gamer Fubuki - Hanako Kokobuji – As Zoe Fries
 Aria - Aika S. Granzchesta 
 Assemble Insert - Maron Namikaze
 Attack on Titan - Zoe Hange
 Blue Seed - Miyako, Yukiko (Ep. 7)
 Boogiepop Phantom - Moto Tonomura, Poom Poom
 Brynhildr in the Darkness - Kotori Takatori
 Comic Party - Eimi Ohba
 Compiler - Assembler
 Cutie Honey Universe - Honey Kisaragi / Cutie Honey
 Demon Fighter Kocho - Kocho Enoki
 Detonator Orgun - Kumi Jefferson/Mhiku
 Dirty Pair OAV - Yuri
 DNA² - Karin Aoi
 Dog & Scissors - Natsuno Kirihime
 Dragon Half - Mink
 Emma – A Victorian Romance - Eleanor Campbell
 Excel Saga - Excel (Eps. 1-13)
 Fairy Tail the Movie: Phoenix Priestess - Éclair
 Gall Force - Spea (Movies 2-3), Anne (Earth Chapter)
 Gatchaman Crowds - Hajime Ichinose
 Genshiken - Keiko Sasahara
 Girls und Panzer - Saori Takabe
 Gokudo - Djin (Female, Eps. 9-12), Nanya
 Hells - Rinne's Mother
 His and Her Circumstances - Tsukino Miyazawa
 Hitorijime My Hero - Megumi
 I Dream of Mimi - Performa
 Ikki Tousen - Ekitoku Chouhi
 Infinite Stratos II  - Tatenashi Sarashiki
 Kimagure Orange Road: Summer's Beginning - Hikaru 
 K.O. Beast - S.P. Icegal
 Kujibiki Unbalance - President Ritsuko Kubel Kettenkrad 
 Labyrinth of Flames - Natsu
 Legend of Himiko - Seika
 Life Lessons with Uramichi Oniisan - Utano Tadano
 Magical DoReMi - Ellie Craft, Drona 
 Maria Holic - Kanako Miyamae
 Munto - Toche
 New Cutie Honey - Honey Kisaragi / Cutey Honey
 Patlabor: The TV Series - Kiyama (Ep. 16)
 Pokémon - Kay, the Raichu Trainer (Ep. 90)
 Pop Team Epic - Pipimi (Ep. 10a)
 Problem Children are Coming from Another World, aren't they? - Black Rabbit
 Princess Minerva - Princess Minerva
 Queen's Blade - Nanael
 Rozen Maiden Zurücksplen - Suigintou
 Ruin Explorers - Fam
 Sex Demon Queen - Rima
 Shingu: Secret of the Stellar Wars - Yukari Morimura, TV Reporter
 Slayers: The Motion Picture - Meliroon
 Sohryuden: Legend of the Dragon Kings - Matsuri Toba, Eri Asada
 Space Pirate Mito - Kafuko, Miss Okubo
 Spectral Force - Hiro
 The World God Only Knows - Haqua du Lot Herminium (Season 3, OVAs)
 Those Who Hunt Elves - Celsia Marie Claire (eps. 1–13)

 To Heart - Shiho
 Ushio to Tora - Asako Nakamura (OVAs)
 UQ Holder! - Ku Fei
 Virgin Fleet - Ise Haruoshimi, Shiokaze Umino
 Virus Buster Serge - Donna, Yui-Lin Manus
 The World of Narue - Narumi Mutuski, Rin Asakura – As Zoe Fries

Live-action dubbing
 Beautiful Hunter - Shion
 Beautiful Prey - Noriko
 Big Boobs Buster - Masako
 The Bondage Master - Reiko
 The Dimension Travelers - Mayumi Iwase
 Zero Woman: The Accused - Reiko Sato

Animation
 GoGoRiki - Olgariki

Video games
 Street Fighter V - Yamato Nadeshiko
 Tycoon City: New YorkWeb
 Cyanide & Happiness - Susan Furrabruisin (The Weatherman short)
 Cyanide & Happiness - Meg (Going Down short)
 Cyanide & Happiness - Woman (Sad Larry In Love short)
 Cyanide & Happiness - Mom (Dinner With the Parents short)
 Cyanide & Happiness - Lucy (Master Dater Series)
 Hellsing Ultimate Abridged - Rip van Winkle (Episode 4)

Production Credits

Production Assistant
 Comic Party Gravitation K.O. Beast Madara Shingu: Secret of the Stellar Wars''

References

External links 
 
 
 
 Jessica Calvello at SciFi.com
 Emerging Artists Theatre

American video game actresses
American voice actresses
Living people
Actresses from Texas
Actresses from New York City
Actresses from Austin, Texas
20th-century American actresses
21st-century American actresses
Year of birth missing (living people)